561 Züm Queen West is an express bus route in Brampton, Ontario that was introduced on September 6, 2016 as part of Züm phase 2. It runs from Mount Pleasant GO Station where it connects with 505 Züm Bovaird and continues west along Bovaird Drive, south along Mississauga Road, and east along Queen Street to Downtown Brampton Terminal. The route currently operates only on weekdays during rush hours and midday. This is mainly due because of the widening project along Queen Street from Chinguacousy Road to Mississauga Road is still ongoing or lower ridership that as it is on 501 Züm Queen. The Brampton Transit 1 Queen shares the entire length with this route and operates 30 minutes or better all day, every day. 

The 561 was suspended due to the COVID-19 pandemic in the Regional Municipality of Peel. As of September 6, 2022, route 561 has been restored to service.

Stops

Controversy 

At that time when this route was implemented, several widening projects including Queen Street west of Chinguacousy, Mississauga Road north of Williams Parkway, and Bovaird Drive west of Mount Pleasant GO station were still ongoing and was not finished until November 2017. As a result, some of the Züm stations including Bovaird, Creditview, and James Potter were still unopened and was not expected to open until the widening project is complete because the road's width did not reach the Züm stations. Instead, temporary bus stops were placed nearby disabled Züm stations along the route. Also, heavy traffic and construction activities could result in bus delays along the route.

References

Züm bus routes
2016 establishments in Ontario